Main Krishna Hoon is a 2013 Hindi partly animated film directed by Rajiv S. Ruia which stars Juhi Chawla, Paresh Ganatra, and child artist Namit Shah as the primary cast and features real-life Hindi film superstars Hrithik Roshan and Katrina Kaif in guest appearances as themselves.  The Hindu god Lord Krishna appears as an animated character in this story, to help an orphaned boy also named Krishna.

Cast
Juhi Chawla (Kantaben)
Paresh Ganatra (Nattubhai)
Namit Shah (Krishna, the orphan)
Raj Premi (Angar Singh)
Rajan Verma and Namit Shah (Paddu Singh) and Krishna
Swati Aggarwal (Parsi Teacher)
Hrithik Roshan as himself
Katrina Kaif as herself
Rajneesh Duggal (special appearance as featured male dancer in song "Govinda Aala Re")
Misti Mukherjee (special appearance as featured female dancer in song "Govinda Aala Re")

Plot summary
An abandoned baby boy is rescued from floodwaters by Kantaben (Juhi Chawla) and Nattubhai (Paresh Ganatra), the kindly proprietors of a small orphanage.  They name the baby Krishna, because the way he was found parallels the legend of how the God Lord Krishna came to live with his adopted parents as a baby.  Orphan Krishna (Namit Shah) lives happily in the orphanage with Kanta and Nattu and the other foundling children.  But over the years, as one by one his other friends are adopted out to families but he remains, young Krishna comes to believe that he is unadoptable, unwanted, and will never find a family.  In despair, all alone one night he goes to a temple and prays to Lord Krishna.  This is the story of how Lord Krishna himself (in his mischievous childhood 'makhan chor' 'butter thief' avatar) comes to Earth and befriends the young orphan Krishna.  Many adventures then ensue, as Krishna-from-Heaven helps Krishna-from-Earth to discover his family.

Production
Lead actress Juhi Chawla accepted the central role of Kantaben, the headmistress of the orphanage, in this children's movie for the sake of her own two children, then aged 11 and 9, who had particularly enjoyed the earlier My Friend Ganesha movies by this same director Rajiv S Ruia and made her realise how much children really enjoy and need such films specifically designed for a child audience.  She also sang the playback recording herself for "Om Namo Namah", which is picturised throughout the opening credits.

First-time producers Nandan K. Mahto and Promila Hunter are the longtime spot boy and hairdresser, respectively, of Hindi film superstars Hrithik Roshan and Katrina Kaif, which is why Mr Roshan and Ms Kaif both readily agreed to be a part of their old friends' debut movie.

Celebrated dance director Ganesh Acharya choreographed the big dahi handi number, "Govinda Aala Re", which featured Rajneesh Duggal and Misti Mukherjee in non-speaking special appearances as the lead male and female dancers.

Music
The music for Main Krishna Hoon is given by Amjad-Nadeem and consist of following Audio List.

Audio Listing

References

External links

2013 films
Indian 3D films
Indian children's films
2010s Hindi-language films
Indian films with live action and animation
Krishna in popular culture
2013 3D films
2010s children's films